Gojirasaurus (meaning "Godzilla lizard") is genus of coelophysoid theropod dinosaur named after the giant monster movie character Gojira (the Hepburn romanized Japanese name for the monster Godzilla).

Etymology
The composite term Gojirasaurus is derived from the name of the giant Japanese movie monster "Gojira" (Godzilla) and the Greek word "" meaning "lizard"; thus, "Godzilla lizard". In addition, a theropod dinosaur with the name Godzillasaurus exists in the Heisei era of Godzilla films, and in that continuity is explained to be the non mutated form of Godzilla. "Gojira" was selected as a reference to the great size of this theropod, which exceeded that of its Triassic counterparts.  The specific name quayi, is a reference to Quay County, New Mexico, where the holotype specimen was discovered. Gojirasaurus was described and named by Kenneth Carpenter in 1997 and the type species is Gojirasaurus quayi.

Description
Carpenter (1997) pointed to features of the pelvis and ankle suggesting that this was an immature individual, and could therefore have grown to even a larger size in maturity. Christopher T. Griffith (2019) confirmed Gojirasaurus possessed features indicative of ontogenetic immaturity. Specimen NMMNH P-4666, which consists of only a pubis, was referred to this genus by Hunt in 1994.

Classification
In 1994 Adrian Hunt, in his unpublished thesis, described and named this material "Revueltoraptor lucasi" which is now considered a nomen nudum. Carpenter officially described and named UCM 47221, Gojirasaurus quayi in 1997 and classified it as a coelophysoid. The original remains attributed to this dinosaur included a serrated tooth, a cervical rib, two anterior dorsal ribs, one posterior dorsal rib, a right scapula, two gastralia, four vertebrae, one anterior chevron, a right pubis, a left tibia, and one metatarsal. Tykoski and Rowe (2004) and later Carrano et al. (2005) agreed that Gojirasaurus is more derived than Dilophosaurus Later, Nesbitt et al. (2007) argued that the vertebrae actually belonged to the rauisuchian Shuvosaurus, and the pubis and tibia belonged to another coelophysoid, indistinguishable from the contemporary Coelophysis, making the status of Gojirasaurus as a valid genus dubious; however, Lucas et al. (2007) rebutted the synonymy with Shuvosaurus, claiming that this assignment isn't supported, in spite of the taphonomic association.

Distinguishing anatomical features
According to Nesbitt et al. (2007), Gojirasaurus can be distinguished based on the fact that its tibia is more robust than that of its relative Coelophysis. Mortimer (2012) has proposed that the observed difference in the leg bone might be just size-related, and not a true apomorphy. Rauhut (2003) attempted to diagnose this genus based on the fact that the mid/posterior dorsal vertebrae had taller neural spines than those observed in other coelophysoids. However, the reassignment of the dorsal vertebrae on which the diagnosis was based would render it invalid.

Paleoecology
The only known specimen of Gojirasaurus was discovered in the Cooper Canyon Formation of the Dockum Group near Revuelto Creek, Quay County, in New Mexico. This genus was discovered in 1981, in gray carbonaceous mudstone deposited during the Norian stage of the Late Triassic, which based on magnetostratigraphy, was approximately 228 to 208 million years ago. This specimen is housed in the collection of the University of Colorado Museum, in Boulder, Colorado. Gojirasaurus'''s assignment to the Coelophysoidea, would suggest that it was a bipedal, terrestrial, actively mobile carnivore.  Contemporaries of Gojirasaurus included the pseudosuchian Shuvosaurus, and the phytosaur Rutiodon''.

See also

 Timeline of coelophysoid research

References

External links
 Specimen NMMNH P-4666

Late Triassic dinosaurs of North America
Coelophysoids
Godzilla (franchise)
Taxa named by Kenneth Carpenter
Paleontology in New Mexico